is a Japanese public high school in Chuo-ku, Sapporo, Hokkaido. Sapporo Odori High School provides Japanese-language classes to foreign and Japanese returnee students, and the school has special admissions quotas for these groups.

References

External links
 Sapporo Odori High School
  Sapporo Odori High School

High schools in Hokkaido
Schools in Sapporo